Manuel De Jesus Rodríguez (born August 6, 1996) is a Mexican professional baseball pitcher in the Chicago Cubs organization.

Career
Rodríguez began his professional career in the Mexican League with the Leones de Yucatán, playing for them from 2014 through 2016. He was named the 2015 Mexican League Rookie of the Year, after posting a 4–0 record with a 1.84 ERA over 49 innings. Rodríguez's contract was purchased by the Chicago Cubs from Yucatán on July 21, 2016 for $400,000. He played for the Eugene Emeralds and the South Bend Cubs in 2017, going a combined 1–0 with a 3.94 ERA over  innings. He spent the 2018 season with South Bend, going 3–5 with a 7.59 ERA and 64 strikeouts over  innings. He spent the 2019 season with the Myrtle Beach Pelicans, going 1–3 with a 3.45 ERA and52 hits, 36 walks, and 65 strikeouts over 45 innings.

Rodríguez was added to the Cubs 40-man roster after the 2019 season. He opened the 2021 season with the Tennessee Smokies and the Iowa Cubs. In June 2021, Rodríguez was selected to play in the All-Star Futures Game.

On July 30, 2021, Chicago promoted him to the major leagues for the first time. He made his MLB debut that night, throwing a scoreless inning with two strikeouts in relief.

In 2021 he was 3-3 with a 6.11 ERA with the major league team. In 20 games he pitched 17.2 innings, in which he gave up 18 runs, 12 earned.

Rodríguez was placed on the injured list on April 14, 2022, with a right elbow strain. He was later transferred to the 60-day injured list on June 1.

On January 17, 2023, Rodríguez was designated for assignment by Chicago following the acquisition of Julian Merryweather. On January 23, Rodríguez cleared waivers and was sent outright to Triple-A Iowa.

References

External links

1996 births
Living people
Cañeros de Los Mochis players
Chicago Cubs players
Eugene Emeralds players
Iowa Cubs players
Major League Baseball pitchers
Major League Baseball players from Mexico
Mexican expatriate baseball players in the United States
Mexican League baseball pitchers
Leones de Yucatán players
Myrtle Beach Pelicans players
South Bend Cubs players
Sportspeople from Mérida, Yucatán
Tennessee Smokies players